The 1990 Saxony-Anhalt state election was held on 14 October 1990 to elect the members of the first Landtag of Saxony-Anhalt. It was the first election held in Saxony-Anhalt since the reunification of Germany, which took place on 3 October. The Christian Democratic Union (CDU) led by Gerd Gies emerged as the largest party with 39.0%, followed by the Social Democratic Party (SPD) with 26.0%. The CDU formed a coalition with the Free Democratic Party (FDP), and Gies became Saxony-Anhalt's first post-reunification Minister-President.

Parties
The table below lists parties which won seats in the election.

Election result

|-
! colspan="2" | Party
! Votes
! %
! Seats 
! Seats %
|-
| bgcolor=| 
| align=left | Christian Democratic Union (CDU)
| align=right| 550,815
| align=right| 39.0
| align=right| 48
| align=right| 45.3
|-
| bgcolor=| 
| align=left | Social Democratic Party (SPD)
| align=right| 367,254
| align=right| 26.0
| align=right| 27
| align=right| 25.5
|-
| bgcolor=| 
| align=left | Free Democratic Party (FDP)
| align=right| 190,800
| align=right| 13.5
| align=right| 14
| align=right| 13.2
|-
| bgcolor=| 
| align=left | Party of Democratic Socialism (PDS)
| align=right| 169,319
| align=right| 12.0
| align=right| 12
| align=right| 11.3
|-
| bgcolor=| 
| align=left | The Greens (Grüne)
| align=right| 74,696
| align=right| 5.3
| align=right| 5
| align=right| 4.7
|-
! colspan=8|
|-
| bgcolor=| 
| align=left | German Social Union (DSU)
| align=right| 24,144
| align=right| 1.7
| align=right| 0
| align=right| 0
|-
| bgcolor=#3A60D7| 
| align=left | Democratic Women's League (DFD)
| align=right| 15,628
| align=right| 1.1
| align=right| 0
| align=right| 0
|-
| bgcolor=|
| align=left | Others
| align=right| 19,856
| align=right| 1.4
| align=right| 0
| align=right| 0
|-
! align=right colspan=2| Total
! align=right| 1,412,512
! align=right| 100.0
! align=right| 106
! align=right| 
|-
! align=right colspan=2| Voter turnout
! align=right| 
! align=right| 65.1
! align=right| 
! align=right| 
|}

Sources
 [www.stala.sachsen-anhalt.de/wahlen/lt90/index.html Landtagswahl 1990]

1990
Saxony-Anhalt
October 1990 events in Europe